Lemierre is a surname. Notable people with the surname include:

 André Lemierre (1875–1956), French bacteriologist
 Antoine-Marin Lemierre (1733–1793), French dramatist and poet
 Auguste-Jacques Lemierre d'Argy (1762–1815), French writer and translator, nephew of Antoine-Marin